Rolland Leslie "Rolly" Tasker AM (21 March 192622 June 2012) was an Australian sailor who won Australia's first Olympic sailing medal, at the 1956 Olympic Games in Melbourne.  He and Malcolm (Huck) Scott won a silver medal in their 12m2 Sharpie after the New Zealander Peter Mander failed to disqualify himself and Rolly had not officially protested. In 1958 Tasker won the Flying Dutchman World Championship.

From 1969 to 1985 Tasker dominated ocean racing in Western Australia with five sister yachts all called Siska.  In the 1978 Sydney to Hobart Yacht Race, Siska IV was denied official starter status on a technicality.  Tasker started five minutes ahead of the fleet and crossed the finish line 20 hours ahead of line honours winner Apollo. He won numerous other ocean racing events in his career including taking line honours and first place in the Queen Victoria Cup off Cowes, England.  He competed in the disastrous 1979 Fastnet race, finishing third across the line.  In the Parmelia Yacht Race from Plymouth to Fremantle in 1979, he finished second in the line honours race, and was the fastest yacht for each of the two legs.

Tasker was inducted into the Western Australian Hall of Champions in 1986 and the Sport Australian Hall of Fame in 1996.  He became a Member of the Order of Australia in 2006 for his services to sailing.

He operated a sail-making business based in Phuket, Thailand called Rolly Tasker Sails.

In April 2008 Tasker opened the Australian Sailing Museum in Mandurah, Western Australia, with exhibits of the America's Cup races from 1851 and famous sailors from Australian sailing competitions. Twelve lifelike icons of the sailing world form part of the display, along with over 200 model yacht fleet class examples on a scale 1" to the foot.

His biography, Sailing to the Moon was published in 2008. It is written by Roland Perry and describes Tasker's extensive sailing and business activities.

In 2017, he was an inaugural inductee in the Australian Sailing Hall of Fame.

References

External links
 Rolly Tasker AM at the Australian Sailing Hall of Fame
 
 
  (archive 2) (archive 3)
 
 

1926 births
2012 deaths
Australian male sailors (sport)
Olympic sailors of Australia
Olympic silver medalists for Australia
Olympic medalists in sailing
Members of the Order of Australia
Sailors at the 1956 Summer Olympics – 12 m2 Sharpie
Sailors at the 1960 Summer Olympics – Flying Dutchman
Medalists at the 1956 Summer Olympics
Flying Dutchman class world champions
World champions in sailing for Australia
Sport Australia Hall of Fame inductees
Sportsmen from Western Australia
Sportspeople from Perth, Western Australia
Sailmakers